Stefan Bajcetic Maquieira (born 22 October 2004) is a Spanish professional footballer who plays as a centre-back or defensive midfielder for  club Liverpool.

Early life
Stefan Bajcetic Maquieira was born on 22 October 2004 in Vigo (Galicia, Spain). He is the son of the Serbian former footballer Srđan Bajčetić and a Galician mother.

Club career
Bajcetic was a product of the Celta Vigo youth academy, and signed for Premier League club Liverpool in December 2020.

Bajcetic's progress was rewarded with a new contract in August 2022. He made his professional debut on 27 August, coming on as a substitute in a 9–0 home victory over AFC Bournemouth. Bajcetic made his UEFA Champions League debut against Ajax on 13 September as a 94th-minute substitution, replacing Thiago.  In doing so, he became Liverpool's youngest-ever player in the Champions League, beating a record previously held by Billy Koumetio.

On 9 November 2022, Bajcetic started his first game for Liverpool, in the home win against Derby County in the third round of the 2022–23 EFL Cup.  On 26 December, as a 79th-minute substitute, Bajcetic scored his first senior goal for Liverpool in their 3–1 victory away to Aston Villa in the 2022–23 Premier League. Aged , he became the third youngest player to score for Liverpool in the Premier League, behind Michael Owen and Raheem Sterling, and the second youngest Spanish player to score in the Premier League, behind Cesc Fàbregas.

In January 2023, Bajcetic's progress was rewarded with a new long-term contract at Anfield. On the field, he continued to progress, starting three consecutive Premier League games against Chelsea, Wolverhampton Wanderers, and local rivals Everton. On 16 February, he was voted January’s Player of the Month by fans. On 21 February, he became the youngest Liverpool player, aged 18 years and 122 days, to start in a Champions League knockout match, which ended in a 2–5 home defeat against Real Madrid.

On 16 March 2023 he announced he would miss the rest of the season with an adductor injury.

International career
Bajcetic is eligible to represent Spain and Serbia at international level. He is a youth international for Spain, having played for the Spain U18s in 2021 and Spain U19s in 2022.

Career statistics

References

External links

Profile at the Liverpool F.C. website

2004 births
Living people
Footballers from Vigo
Spanish footballers
Association football defenders
Association football midfielders
RC Celta de Vigo players
Liverpool F.C. players
Premier League players
Spain youth international footballers
Spanish expatriate footballers
Expatriate footballers in England
Spanish expatriate sportspeople in England
Spanish people of Serbian descent